The Palace Gardens Below Prague Castle (Czech: Palácové zahrady pod Pražským hradem) are located in Malá Strana, Prague, Czech Republic.

References

External links
 

Gardens in Prague
Malá Strana